Jean-Laurent Bonnafé (born 14 July 1961) has been serving as chief executive officer of BNP Paribas since 2011.

Early life and education
The son of an Électricité de France (EDF) electrical engineer and a lawyer in Albi, Bonnafé attended the Lycée Louis-le-Grand and later graduated in engineering from the École Polytechnique and École des Mines.

Career
Following his studies, Bonnafé joined the Ministry of Industry before moving into private equity and then BNP in 1993. At BNP, he formulated the bank’s double bid for Société Générale (SocGen) and Paribas in 1999, which ended with BNP winning the latter but forced to drop its offer for SocGen. He was widely credited with implementing the acquisitions of Paribas, BNL and Fortis.

In 2011, Bonnafé was appointed as chief executive, taking over from Baudouin Prot. In 2017, his compensation was at $4.5 million.

Other activities

Corporate boards
 Banca Nazionale del Lavoro, Member of the Board of Directors (since 2009)
 Carrefour, Member of the Board of Directors (since 2008)
 BNP Paribas Fortis, Non-Executive Member of the Board of Directors (2011-2014)

Non-profit organizations
 Fédération Bancaire Française, Chairman (since 2017)
 Association pour le Rayonnement de l’Opéra de Paris (AROP), Chairman
 Bocconi University, Member of the International Advisory Council
 Entreprises pour l’Environnement, Vice-Chairman
 La France s’engage Foundation, Member of the Board

References

1961 births
Living people
French bankers
École Polytechnique alumni
Mines Paris - PSL alumni
Corps des mines
BNP Paribas people
Chevaliers of the Légion d'honneur
Chief executives in the finance industry
French chief executives
People from Albi